Naso is a genus of fish in the surgeonfish family, Acanthuridae. Fish of this genus are known commonly as unicornfishes because of the "rostral protuberance", a hornlike extension of the forehead present in some species. 
Unicorn fish are popular with spearfishermen and may be cooked by grilling them whole. Unicornfish primarily live around coral reefs and eat mostly algae. It is very popular in Maldives.

This genus is distributed across the Indo-Pacific from Africa to Hawaii.

Species
The 20 currently recognized species in this genus are:
 Naso annulatus (Quoy & Gaimard, 1825) – whitemargin unicornfish
 Naso brachycentron (Valenciennes, 1835) – humpback unicornfish
 Naso brevirostris (G. Cuvier, 1829) – short-nosed unicornfish, spotted unicornfish
 Naso caeruleacauda J. E. Randall, 1994 – bluetail unicornfish, blue unicorn
 Naso caesius J. E. Randall & Bell, 1992 – gray unicornfish
 Naso elegans (Rüppell, 1829) – elegant unicornfish, orange-spine unicorn
 Naso fageni Morrow, 1954 – horseface unicornfish
 Naso hexacanthus (Bleeker, 1855) – sleek unicornfish, blacktongue unicorn
 Naso lituratus (J. R. Forster, 1801) – orangespine unicornfish
 Naso lopezi Herre, 1927 – elongated unicornfish
 Naso maculatus J. E. Randall & Struhsaker, 1981 – spotted unicornfish
 Naso mcdadei J. W. Johnson, 2002 – squarenose unicornfish
 Naso minor (J. L. B. Smith, 1966) – slender unicorn
 Naso reticulatus J. E. Randall, 2001 – reticulated unicornfish
 Naso tergus H. C. Ho, K. N. Shen & C. W. Chang, 2011
 Naso thynnoides (G. Cuvier, 1829) – oneknife unicornfish
 Naso tonganus (Valenciennes, 1835) – bulbnose unicornfish
 Naso tuberosus Lacépède, 1801 – humpnose unicornfish
 Naso unicornis (Forsskål, 1775) – bluespine unicornfish
 Naso vlamingii (Valenciennes, 1835) – bignose unicornfish

References

 
Acanthuridae
Extant Eocene first appearances
Marine fish genera
Taxa named by Bernard Germain de Lacépède